This article lists the fixtures of the knockout stage for the 2018 Thomas Cup in Bangkok, Thailand. It began on 24 May with the quarter-finals and ended on 27 May with the final match of the tournament.

Qualified teams

Bracket

Quarter-finals

China vs Chinese Taipei

Indonesia vs Malaysia

France vs Japan

South Korea vs Denmark

Semi-finals

China vs Indonesia

Japan vs Denmark

Final

China vs Japan

References

Thomas knockout stage